Lucian Cotora (born 16 February 1969) is a Romanian former footballer who played as a defender. His brother, Florin Cotora was also a footballer, they played together at Inter Sibiu. After he ended his playing career he worked as a youth coach.

International career
Lucian Cotora played one friendly game at international level for Romania, when coach Anghel Iordănescu used him in a 1–0 loss against Greece.

Honours
Inter Sibiu
Divizia B: 1987–88
Balkans Cup: 1990–91

Notes

References

1969 births
Living people
Romanian footballers
Romania international footballers
Association football defenders
Liga I players
Liga II players
FC Inter Sibiu players
CSM Unirea Alba Iulia players
FC Dinamo București players